Morelli Ridge is a ridge,  long, that extends north from Hoehn Peak into the upper part of Bartley Glacier, in the Asgard Range of Victoria Land, Antarctica. It was named by the Advisory Committee on Antarctic Names in 1997 after Frank A. Morelli of the Bioscience and Planetology Section at the Jet Propulsion Laboratory of the California Institute of Technology, who studied the surface distribution of microorganisms in soils of the McMurdo Dry Valleys in the 1970–71 field season. Morelli was also a member of the environmental monitoring team for the Dry Valley Drilling Project in 1973–74.

References

Ridges of Victoria Land
McMurdo Dry Valleys